Kfar Tzvi Sitrin (lit. Zvi Sitrin Village), also known as Beit Tzvi (lit. Zvi House) is a technical college and village in northern Israel. Located near Highway 4, it falls under the jurisdiction of Hof HaCarmel Regional Council.

History

The village was established in 1953 as a professional religious school, and was named after Zvi Sitrin, a leader of Hapoel HaMizrachi in the United States. In the following years, the area was bought by Lev Leviev, and was used as a school and yeshiva named "Or Avner" after Leviev's father.

References

Villages in Israel
Education in Israel
Populated places established in 1953
Populated places in Haifa District
1953 establishments in Israel